Randal Jones (born June 24, 1969 in Winston-Salem, North Carolina) is an American bobsledder.  Jones competed in both the 2-man and 4-man events in four Winter Olympics.

High school
Jones attended Robert B. Glenn High School in Kernersville, North Carolina and was a standout track and football star.  Jones was a big part in leading the school to a state championship in track in 1986.  Jones graduated from Glenn High School in 1987.

College career
Jones attended Duke University, where he played football and ran track while earning a Mechanical Engineering degree.  Graduating from Duke in 1991, he still holds five team football records for Duke in kick returns and was also a record-setting track athlete.

Bobsledding career
Jones' track coach at Duke convinced him after graduating to try out for the U.S. Bobsled team.  Combined with a desire to see the world, Jones accepted the invitation to join the team.  He won the National Brakeman and Side Push Championship twice in both 1992 and 1995, along with the World Cup and Overall Championship in 1992–93.

Jones made his Olympic debut in 1994 in Lillehammer, finishing 13th in the 2-man event. He came up short in the 1998 Winter Olympics in Nagano as the 4-man team with driver Brian Shimer and pushers Chip Minton and Garrett Hines missed by .02 seconds of winning a bronze medal, finishing fifth.

After winning four World Cup medals, 2002 saw Jones have the best year of his career in bobsledding.  At the 2002 Winter Olympics in Salt Lake City, Jones along with driver Todd Hays, won a silver medal in the 4-man event.  This marked the first time since 1956 that the United States won a medal in men's bobsledding. Jones also won three medals in the four-man event at the FIBT World Championships with a silver (2003) and two bronzes (1993, 1997).

In 2005-06, Jones' best finish in the World Cup was second at the 4-man event held in Calgary, Alberta, Canada. He was at the 2006 Winter Olympics, but did not run in either competition. Jones is now part of the United States Olympic Committee and is widely considered as the most decorated bobsledder in U.S. history.

Personal life
Jones is married to his wife, Cheri Alou, and currently resides in Atlanta, Georgia. Jones and his wife Cheri also have twins, Roman and Marissa, who reside with them in Atlanta, Georgia. Jones currently works as a Technology Director for Omnicom Media Group.

References

External links
 Bobsleigh four-man Olympic medalists for 1924, 1932–56, and since 1964
 Bobsleigh four-man world championship medalists since 1930
 Black Press USA profile
 ESPN.com profile on Jones
 FIBT profile 
 United States Olympic Committee profile 
 

1969 births
American male bobsledders
American football return specialists
American male sprinters
Bobsledders at the 1994 Winter Olympics
Bobsledders at the 1998 Winter Olympics
Bobsledders at the 2002 Winter Olympics
Bobsledders at the 2006 Winter Olympics
Olympic silver medalists for the United States in bobsleigh
Duke Blue Devils football players
Living people
Sportspeople from Atlanta
Sportspeople from Winston-Salem, North Carolina
Medalists at the 2002 Winter Olympics